Sassi Aziz was the Algerian minister for trade in the 1995 government of Mokdad Sifi.

References

Living people
Year of birth missing (living people)
Place of birth missing (living people)
Trade ministers of Algeria
20th-century Algerian politicians